The Economy of Timor is covered in the following articles:
 Economy of East Timor
 Economy of West Timor

See also
 Economy of Indonesia